Gyrolepis is an extinct genus of prehistoric ray-finned fish from the Middle-Late Triassic epochs in what is now Europe. It is known both from complete specimens and isolated skeletal elements, such as scales or teeth.

See also

 Prehistoric fish
 List of prehistoric bony fish

References

External links
 Bony fish in the online Sepkoski Database

Prehistoric bony fish genera